Consensus reality is that which is generally agreed to be reality, based on a consensus view.

The appeal to consensus arises from the idea that humans do not fully understand or agree upon the nature of knowledge or ontology, often making it uncertain what is real, given the vast inconsistencies between individual subjectivities. Humans can, however, seek to obtain some form of consensus, with others, of what is real. This consensus can be used as a pragmatic guide, either on the assumption that it seems to approximate some kind of valid reality, or simply because it is more "practical" than perceived alternatives. Consensus reality therefore refers to the agreed-upon concepts of reality which people in the world, or a culture or group, believe are real (or treat as real), usually based upon their common experiences as they believe them to be; anyone who does not agree with these is sometimes stated to be "in effect... living in a different world."

Throughout history this has also raised a social question as to the effects of a society in which all individuals do not agree upon the same reality.

Children have sometimes been described or viewed as "inexperience[d] with consensus reality," though are described as such with the expectation that their perspective will progressively form closer to the consensus reality of their society as they age.

General discussion
In considering the nature of reality, two broad approaches exist: the realist approach, in which there is a single, objective, overall reality believed to exist irrespective of the perceptions of any given individual, and the idealistic approach, in which it is considered that an individual can verify nothing except their own experience of the world, and can never directly know the truth of the world independent of that.

Berger and Luckmann argue that "reality is socially constructed and that the sociology of knowledge must analyze the process in which this occurs". Rather than being a purely philosophical topic, the question of reality includes, for them, the sociological study of consensus reality.

Consider this example: consensus reality for people who follow a particular theocentric religion is different from consensus reality for those who follow another theocentric religion, or from those that eschew theocentric religions in favor of science alone, for explaining life and the universe.

In societies where theocentric religions are dominant, the religious understanding of existence would be the consensus reality, while the religious worldview would remain the non-consensus (or alternative) reality in a predominantly secular society, where the consensus reality is grounded in science alone.

In this way, different individuals and communities have fundamentally different world views, with fundamentally different comprehensions of the world around them, and of the constructs within which they live. Thus, a society that is, for example, completely secular and one which believes every eventuality to be subject to metaphysical influence will have very different consensus realities, and many of their beliefs on broad issues such as science, slavery, and human sacrifice may differ in direct consequence because of the differences in the perceived nature of the world they live in.

In science and philosophy

Idealists
Some idealists (subjective idealists) hold the view that there isn't one particular way things are, but rather that each person's  personal reality is unique. Such idealists have the world view which says that we each create our own reality, and while most people may be in general agreement (consensus) about what reality is like, they might live in a different (or nonconsensus) reality.

Materialists
Materialists may not accept the idea of there being different possible realities for different people, rather than different beliefs about one reality. So for them only the first usage of the term reality would make sense. To them, someone believing otherwise, where the facts have been properly established, might be considered delusional.

Social consequences

Views on the term
The connotation of the term "consensus reality" is usually disparaging: it is usually employed by idealist, surrealist and other anti-realist theorists opposing or hostile to this "reality," with the implication that this consensus reality is, to a greater or lesser extent, created by those who experience it. (The phrase "consensus reality" may be used more loosely to refer to any generally accepted set of beliefs.) However, there are those who use the term approvingly for the practical benefits of all agreeing on a common set of assumptions or experiences.

Consensus vs. consensual reality
Consensus reality is related to, but distinct from, consensual reality. The difference between these terms is that whereas consensus reality describes a state of mutual agreement about what is true (consensus is a noun), consensual reality describes a type of agreement about what is true (consensual is an adjective). In other words, reality may also be non-consensual, as when one person's preferred version of reality conflicts with another person's preferred version of reality. Consensual reality is relevant to understanding a variety of social phenomena, such as deception.

Social aspects
Artists, writers, and theorists have attempted to oppose or undermine consensus reality while others have declared that they are "ignoring" it. For example, Salvador Dalí intended by his paranoiac-critical method to "systematize confusion thanks to a paranoia and active process of thought and so assist in discrediting completely the world of reality".

See also

References

 
Belief
Community building
Reality
Reality by type
Perception
Social constructionism
Concepts in epistemology